Progomphus zephyrus is a species of dragonfly in the family Gomphidae. It is endemic to the Dominican Republic.  Its natural habitats are subtropical or tropical moist lowland forests and rivers. It is threatened by habitat loss.

References

Gomphidae
Insects of the Dominican Republic
Endemic fauna of the Dominican Republic
Insects described in 1941
Taxonomy articles created by Polbot